Marco Antônio de Lima Ruas (born 23 January 1961) is a Brazilian former mixed martial arts fighter, submission wrestler, kickboxer and instructor. Ruas was the UFC 7 Tournament Champion, and also competed for the World Vale Tudo Championship (WVC), PRIDE Fighting Championships and the International Fight League, where he head-coached the Southern California Condors.

Ruas is a pioneer of Mixed martial arts, having fought in a high-profile Vale Tudo bout in 1984, and later winning the UFC 7 tournament in 1995, begin the second Brazilian UFC champion and fourth overall of the organization. Although he was billed as a representative of Luta Livre and thus a high-level submission grappler, he was an equally capable and skilled Muay Thai striker with experience in Capoeira, Boxing, Judo and Taekwondo, Wrestling. He was able to synthesize both grappling and striking into one style, known for begin one of the first proponents of cross-training to compete in mixed martial arts events, and is considered one of the very first well-rounded fighters and true "mixed martial artist". This is represented by his famous quote after winning his fight in WVC 4: "If you grapple me, I punch and kick you. If you punch and kick me, I grapple you. There's no way out."

Ruas transformed his style in his own hybrid martial art which he called "Ruas Vale Tudo". In some later events, his fighting style was simply billed as "Vale Tudo".

Biography 
Ruas was born in Rio de Janeiro, Brazil in 1961. He started his career training Boxing, Taekwondo,  Judo, Capoeira, and Wrestling with renowned Mestre Camisa in Rio de Janeiro at the Santa Luzia club, downtown Rio. However, his primary martial arts eventually became Luta Livre, which he trained under Roberto Leitão Sr., and Muay Thai, which he trained under Luiz Alves, a student of Nélio "Naja" Borges, the man who introduced Thai boxing to Brazil.

As a black belt in Luta Livre, who faced up a legendary quarrel against the Brazilian Jiu-Jitsu fighters in the 1980s and 1990s. In 1984, he participated of the Noite das Artes Marciais ("Night of the Martial Arts") event, fought by representatives of BJJ against representatives of Muay Thai, Kung Fu, Kickboxing and Luta Livre. Ruas represented muay Thai fighting a match against BJJ representative Fernando Pinduka, he used his Luta Livre skills to counter Pinduka's grappling and the match went to draw. After the match against Pinduka, he started training in Brazilian jiu-jitsu with Osvaldo Alves. Later he trained Joe Moreira before his fight against the Russian boxer Yuri Vaulin. Seeing his good skills in grappling, Moreira gave him a black belt in Brazilian jiu-jitsu and caused a commotion and controversy among his fellow Brazilians, due the rivalry between the two martial arts. His instructors included Euclydes Hatem.

Eventually, Ruas became famous among the Brazilian martial arts circle and one of the most regarded non-BJJ fighters in Brazil due his philosophy of Cross-Training and in synthesizing all martial arts he knew for both Vale Tudo contests and self-defense into a new hybrid martial art he dubbed "Ruas Vale Tudo". However, this philosophy also caused controversy among Brazilian fighters and he was labelled as a Creonte by not only BJJ but also by Luta Livre fighters.

In 1991 he was going to participated in Desafio - Jiu Jitsu vs Luta Livre, an event fought as a challenge between fighters from the two martial arts, Ruas was cast to fight BJJ representative Amaury Bitetti but cancelled his participation and Bitetti was declared winner by W.O. Instead, in 1992 he promoted his own event in Manaus where he defeated Francisco Borges with a rear naked choke. Eventually he attracted the attention of Brazilian manager and fight promoter Frederico Lapenda and was able to get the 34-year-old fighter into the Ultimate Fighting Championship.

Ruas debuted in the Ultimate Fighting Championship at the UFC 7 event in 1995. He firstly faced Larry Cureton, who outweighed him by 40 lbs, but Ruas submitted him with a heel hook after a methodical grapple. His next opponent was the judoka Remco Pardoel, who early tried a guillotine choke, but Ruas blocked it and grinded him with foot stomps. After a failed heel hook attempt, Ruas controlled Pardoel and attacked him with knees and punches on the ground, making him tap out. Ruas's final fight was against 6'8", 330 lb Paul Varelans, and he showed his muay thai skills by overwhelming Varelans with punch combos and repeated leg kicks. He also used again his characteristic foot stomps when Paul clinched him against the cage. At the end, Varelans could not take more kicks to his legs and fell to the ground, where Ruas pounded him until the referee stopped the fight, giving Ruas the victory of the tournament.

Thanks to his victory in UFC 7, Ruas was invited to the Ultimate Ultimate event. He defeated Keith Hackney by choke with ease, but his next opponente, Oleg Taktarov, made a tougher contest. Both fighters used a passive approach to the fight, with Ruas blocking Taktarov's takedown attempts and seizing all the opportunities to strike him, actually making him bleed profusely. However, the judges gave the decision win to Taktarov, and Ruas was eliminated from the tournament. This decision was met with controversy, and Ruas and his cornermen appealed to the referee, but nothing came from it. In 1996 he joined the nascent World Vale Tudo Championship (WVC) organized by his manager Frederico Lapenda, fighting in the superfight against UFC 3 Tournament Champion Steve Jennum in Tokyo, Japan. He won easily with a submission to punches and won the WVC Superfight belt. Almost a year after his last UFC fight, he faced Taktarov again in Brazil, in a bout with no judges. The rematch ended in a draw, but Ruas was clearly the most dominanting fighter, and he shook hands with Oleg after the fight. He kept the WVC Superfight belt in the process. He finished his run in the organization with his last superfight against UFC 2 finalist Patrick Smith in the WVC 4 event, easily winning with a heel hook.

Ruas briefly joined the stable of Antônio "Sebastião" Lacerda, a wealthy man from the north of Brazil and self-proclaimed "Master of Death" who appeared in Rio de Janeiro in 1996 claiming to have spent a long period of time in Japan learning "the deadly art of Yawara." Despite his dubious credentials, Lacerda was able to recruit some established competitors into his sect, including Ruas and Edson Carvalho, a judo national team member and a Carlson Gracie black belt. Seeking opportunities to compete professionally, Ruas began training with Lacerda after Lacerda promised to take him to lucrative competitions abroad, on the condition that he agree to merge his style of vale tudo with Lacerda's techniques. Ruas parted ways with Lacerda when he began to question the effectiveness of Lacerda's techniques and practices, but Carvalho continued participating in Lacerda's challenge, constantly attacking not only jiu-jitsu but all fighting styles.

He was then invited to PRIDE Fighting Championships in 1998, he first had a match against UFC veteran Gary Goodridge at PRIDE 2, winning with a heel hook after a 9-minute bout. At PRIDE 4 he fought Japanese shoot wrestler Alexander Otsuka. In a major upset, Otsuka fought with tenacity, taking Ruas down and performing ground-and-pound, defending a fully locked rear naked choke and forcing a TKO by medical stoppage in the second round. It was later revealed that Ruas fought under medication for Hepatitis and a knee injury. He returned briefly to UFC to fight former heavyweight champion Maurice Smith in UFC 21, but lost by TKO. Ruas suffered an injury in the first round and could not continue.

Around that time, Ruas started to transition from a fighter into a full-time coach, teaching his own "Ruas Vale Tudo" style for a new generation of fighters. Some of his students include UFC light-heavyweight contender Pedro Rizzo and Strikeforce light-heavyweight champion Renato Sobral. He also coached UFC Featherweight Champion José Aldo in Luta Livre, awarding him a black belt in the art, and Aldo was also coached striking and leg kicks by Pedro Rizzo, some of Ruas' own fighting style can be seen in Aldo's.

At this point semi-retired, in 2001 Ruas defeated Jason Lambert at Ultimate Pankration in California in less than 1 minute with a heel hook.

Marco Ruas was invited to participate in the newly formed MMA promotion International Fight League (IFL). This promotion would be divided into different teams (later becoming simply MMA camps) instead of one-on-one affairs, and at the end one of the seasons one of the teams/camps was crowned champion. Ruas coached the "Southern California Condors" team, later simply known as "Ruas Vale Tudo". He also came out from retirement and had one rematch against Maurice Smith (which coached the IFL's "Seattle Tiger Sharks") as the superfight for the IFL: Chigaco event in 2007, which he lost by TKO with a stoppage by his corner. Marco Ruas then fully retired from the sport with a record of 9 wins, 4 losses and 2 draws.

Personal life 
Ruas is married and has three daughters. Marco's first recorded fight was in 1984. Marco's nickname is "The King of the Streets" (Ruas actually means "streets" in Portuguese).
Marco lives in Laguna Niguel, California where he operates his own MMA gym "Ruas Vale Tudo".

Feud with Rickson Gracie 
Ruas developed a feud with Rickson Gracie, both were one of the most skilled and high-profile grapplers of their time, and represent two rival styles that were feuding at the time: Luta Livre and Gracie Jiu-Jitsu. The rivalry started in 1988 when promoters tried to match both fighters to a Vale Tudo match. However, Hélio Gracie refused, demanding either that Rickson received a higher payment or that the bout happened inside the Gracie Academy, which were both rejected, so the fight didn't take place. Gracie claims that he then went to Ruas' academy to challenge him. Ruas accepted it but requested four months to train instead of fighting right away in the gym, Gracie denied it since he would leave Brazil to the United States before that. Ruas however, denies this version, saying that he was ready for a fight, but actually Gracie wanted to fight "Luta Livre guys" and Hélio Gracie who was accompanying Rickson said Ruas wasn't a "real Luta Livre fighter" due his open advocacy of cross-training. A few of Ruas' teammates also joined in and the discussion got heated up and Hélio said "Maybe we should make a list of people who want to fight Rickson", one of the fighters who accepted the challenge was Hugo Duarte, who would have his own scraps with Gracie.

A few years later, both Rickson Gracie and Marco Ruas would gain international fame, Rickson Gracie became winner of the Vale Tudo Japan tournaments in '94 and '95, and headlined Pride 1 and Pride 4, while Ruas became UFC 7 and WVC champion. Rickson became a big celebrity in Japan and in the burgeoning international MMA scene. He became controversial for criticizing other top fighters and said in interviews that Marco Ruas as "nothing special" and "basic". Ruas responded by saying "Talk is cheap. He has to step up in the ring and prove what he says." and issued multiple challenges against Gracie along the years, claiming he was avoiding him as well as other actually skilled fighters. In the end however, no fight was ever materialized between them.

In popular culture
Ruas made a cameo appearance as a jealous husband in Kickboxer 3, in which his character fought and lost to Sasha Mitchell's David Sloane at a party.

Instructor lineage

Luta Livre 
Roberto Leitão Sr. → João Ricardo N. de Almeida → Marco Ruas
 Roberto Leitão Sr. → Marco Ruas

Brazilian Jiu-Jitsu 
Mitsuyo Maeda → Carlos Gracie → Helio Gracie → Francisco Mansur → Joe Moreira → Marco Ruas

Mitsuyo Maeda → Carlos Gracie → Reyson Gracie → Osvaldo Alves → Marco Ruas

Judo 
Jigoro Kano → Soshihiro Satake → Vinícius Ruas → Marco Ruas

Capoeira 
Mestre Bimba → Mestre Camisa → Marco Ruas

Muay Thai 
Nelio Naja → Luiz Alves → Marco Ruas

Taekwondo 
Won Jae Lee → Marco Ruas

Championships and accomplishments 
 Ultimate Fighting Championship
 UFC 7 Tournament Champion
 Ultimate Ultimate 1995 Semi-Finalist
 UFC Viewers Choice Award
 World Vale Tudo Championship
 WVC Superfight Championship (one time)

Mixed martial arts record 

|-
| Loss
|align=center| 9–4–2
| Maurice Smith
| TKO (corner stoppage)
| IFL: Chicago
| 
|align=center| 4
|align=center| 3:43
| Chicago, Illinois, United States
|
|-
| Win
|align=center| 9–3–2
| Jason Lambert
| Submission (heel hook)
| Ultimate Pankration 1
| 
|align=center| 1
|align=center| 0:56
| Cabazon, California, United States
|
|-
| Loss
|align=center| 8–3–2
| Maurice Smith
| TKO (corner stoppage)
| UFC 21
| 
|align=center| 1
|align=center| 5:00
| Cedar Rapids, Iowa, United States
| 
|-
| Loss
|align=center| 8–2–2
| Alexander Otsuka
| TKO (corner stoppage)
| Pride 4
| 
|align=center| 2
|align=center| 10:00
| Tokyo, Japan
|
|-
| Win
|align=center| 8–1–2
| Gary Goodridge
| Submission (heel hook)
| Pride 2
| 
|align=center| 1
|align=center| 9:09
| Yokohama, Japan
|
|-
| Win
|align=center| 7–1–2
| Patrick Smith
| Submission (heel hook)
| World Vale Tudo Championship 4
| 
|align=center| 1
|align=center| 0:39
| Brazil
|
|-
| Draw
|align=center| 6–1–2
| Oleg Taktarov
| Draw
| World Vale Tudo Championship 2
| 
|align=center| 1
|align=center| 31:12
| Brazil
|
|-
| Win
|align=center| 6–1–1
| Steve Jennum
| TKO (submission to punches)
| World Vale Tudo Championship 1
| 
|align=center| 1
|align=center| 1:44
| Tokyo, Japan
| 
|-
| Loss
|align=center| 5–1–1
| Oleg Taktarov
| Decision
| rowspan=2|Ultimate Ultimate 1995
| rowspan=2|
|align=center| 1
|align=center| 18:00
| rowspan=2|Denver, Colorado, United States
|
|-
| Win
|align=center| 5–0–1
| Keith Hackney
| Submission (rear naked choke)
|align=center| 1
|align=center| 2:39
|
|-
| Win
|align=center| 4–0–1
| Paul Varelans
| TKO (leg kicks and punches)
| rowspan=3|UFC 7
| rowspan=3|
|align=center| 1
|align=center| 13:17
| rowspan=3|Buffalo, New York, United States
| 
|-
| Win
|align=center| 3–0–1
| Remco Pardoel
| Submission (position)
|align=center| 1
|align=center| 12:27
|
|-
| Win
|align=center| 2–0–1
| Larry Cureton
| Submission (heel hook)
|align=center| 1
|align=center| 3:23
|
|-
| Win
|align=center| 1–0–1
| Francisco Francisco
| Submission (rear naked choke)
| Ruas Vale Tudo
| 
|align=center| 1
|align=center| 0:26
| Manaus, Brazil
|
|-
| Draw
| align=center| 0–0–1
| Fernando Pinduka
| Draw
| Jiu-Jitsu vs Luta Livre
| 
|align=center| 1
|align=center| 20:00
| Rio de Janeiro, Brazil
|

Filmography

References

External links 
 
 
 Official GYM Marco Ruas
 Marco Ruas IFL Page

1961 births
Living people
Brazilian male mixed martial artists
Mixed martial artists utilizing capoeira
Mixed martial artists utilizing judo
Mixed martial artists utilizing taekwondo
Mixed martial artists utilizing catch wrestling
Mixed martial artists utilizing Muay Thai
Mixed martial artists utilizing boxing
Mixed martial artists utilizing Brazilian jiu-jitsu
Mixed martial artists utilizing Luta Livre
Mixed martial artists utilizing vale tudo
Brazilian catch wrestlers
Brazilian practitioners of Brazilian jiu-jitsu
People awarded a black belt in Brazilian jiu-jitsu
Brazilian male judoka
Brazilian male taekwondo practitioners
Brazilian capoeira practitioners
Brazilian Muay Thai practitioners
Brazilian male boxers
Brazilian male kickboxers
Brazilian male sport wrestlers
People from Laguna Niguel, California
Ultimate Fighting Championship male fighters
Sportspeople from Rio de Janeiro (city)
20th-century Brazilian people
21st-century Brazilian people